The 2017 South American Under-17 Football Championship is an international association football tournament held in Chile. The ten national teams involved in the tournament were required to register a squad of 23 players; only players in these squads are eligible to take part in the tournament.Each player had to have been born after January 1, 2000. All ages as of start of the tournament.

Players name marked in bold have been capped at full international level.

Group A

Bolivia
Head coach: Mauricio Soria

Chile
Head coach: Hernán Caputto

Colombia
Head coach: Orlando Restrepo

Ecuador
Head coach: Gonzalo Alcocer

Uruguay
Head coach: Alejandro Garay

Group B

Argentina
Head coach: Miguel Micó

Brazil
Head coach: Carlos Amadeu

Paraguay
Head coach: Gustavo Morínigo

Peru
Head coach: Juan José Oré

Venezuela
Head coach: José Hernández

References

South American Under-17 Football Championship squads